Andrijana Videnović (born 1 September 1964) is a Serbian theater and movie actress and Associate Professor of Diction at the University of Priština Faculty of Arts, in North Kosovo. She is married to Dragan Jovanović Danilov.

Selected filmography

Film

Television

References

External links 
 
 Picture of Andrijana Videnović in the Gloria magazine
 Biography at the Zvezdara Theater website, Retrieved on 6 June 2010

Serbian film actresses
Serbian stage actresses
Serbian television actresses
Kosovo Serbs
Actors from Pristina
Academic staff of the University of Pristina
Living people
1964 births
University of Arts in Belgrade alumni